The Second Oli cabinet was the Government of Nepal from 15 February 2018 to 13 July 2021. It was initially formed as a majority coalition on 15 February 2018, after Khadga Prasad Sharma Oli was elected as the new Prime Minister of Nepal following the 2017 general election. Oli's candidacy was supported by the Communist Party of Nepal (Unified Marxist–Leninist) and the Communist Party of Nepal (Maoist Centre). He assumed his office along with two ministers with the remaining ministers added at later points. The CPN (Maoist Centre) withdrew its support from the government in May 2021, reducing it to a minority, and after the dissolution of the House of Representatives, it turned into an interim government. The second Oli cabinet was replaced by the fifth Deuba cabinet, formed after the Supreme Court ordered the appointment of Nepali Congress president Sher Bahadur Deuba as prime minister under in accordance with Article 76 (5) of the Constitution of Nepal.

Despite the naming suggesting otherwise, the cabinet is not the extension of the first Oli cabinet, as two different cabinets were formed by two different prime ministers in between both Oli cabinets. Apart from prime minister Oli, only four other ministers served in both cabinets; Giriraj Mani Pokharel and Shakti Bahadur Basnet, who joined the cabinet in the beginning, and Bishnu Prasad Paudel and Top Bahadur Rayamajhi, who were added to the cabinet in a later rearrangement. Pokharel headed the Ministry of Education while Paudel headed the Ministry of Finance both times, whereas Basnet and Rayamajhi served in two different ministries in the two cabinets.

History 
The Constitution of Nepal set the maximum numbers of ministers including state ministers to 25, however, Oli first decided to have 17 ministries under him, which is less than the previous cabinets with each around 30 ministries. It was later expanded to 22 ministries and the addition of three state ministers brought the number of cabinet members to 25.

The first expansion to the cabinet was made on 26 February 2018, when seven more ministers were sworn in, while the second expansion took place on 16 March 2018.

On 11 March 2018, Oli won a motion of confidence with 208 out of 268 votes in the 275-member House of Representatives.

On 17 May 2018, the Communist Party of Nepal (Unified Marxist–Leninist) and the Communist Party of Nepal (Maoist Centre) merged to form the Nepal Communist Party, giving the Oli government a majority in both houses of the federal parliament. On 28 May 2018, the Federal Socialist Forum, Nepal, which would later merge into Samajbadi Party, Nepal on 6 May 2019, joined the government. Samajbadi Party, Nepal left the government on 24 December 2019.

Further major cabinet reshuffles took place on 20 November 2019 and 14 October 2020.

A major ministerial reshuffle took place on 25 December 2020 after several ministers resigned in protest of Oli's move to recommend the dissolution of the House of Representatives which was promptly approved by the president, although it was later overturned by the Supreme Court. All members of the cabinet were members of the Nepal Communist Party until 7 March 2021, when the party was dissolved by a verdict of the Supreme Court. The court's verdict invalidated the ruling party, effectively reviving the former CPN (UML) and CPN (Maoist Centre) parties. This reduced Oli's government back to a coalition government. The CPN (Maoist Centre) recalled its ministers on 13 March 2021 and withdrew its support from the government on 5 May 2021, effectively turning it into a minority government. After Oli failed to obtain a vote of confidence in the parliament, his government was reduced to a caretaker capacity.
Oli became a minority prime minister on 13 May 2021 by president Bidya Devi Bhandari, albeit as a minority prime minister, as none of the opposition parties were able to form a majority government or lay their claim for it in the provided time frame. Citing the provision mentioned in Article 76 (3) of the constitution, Oli, being the leader of the largest party in the House of Representatives, was re-appointed prime minister, requiring him to again prove a majority in the house within 30 days from his appointment. Following the dissolution of the House of Representatives by the president at midnight on 22 May 2021, the Oli government turned into an interim government until new elections, scheduled for 12 and 19 November 2021, were held.

Another major ministerial reshuffle took place on 4 June 2021, after the CPN (UML) formed a coalition with a faction of the People's Socialist Party, Nepal, after negotiations were reached to awards as many as ten ministerial berths to members of the faction led by Mahantha Thakur and Rajendra Mahato. The cabinet was further expanded on 10 June 2021. The Supreme Court, on 22 June 2021, stayed the cabinet expansion and reshuffle by Prime Minister Oli. The petitioners had earlier claimed that the government formed under article 76 (3) of the constitution with a caretaker status cannot expand or reshuffle the cabinet. Twenty ministers (including three deputy prime ministers) appointed on 4 and 10 June 2021 were dismissed from their post. Bishnu Prasad Paudel, who was appointed minister of Finance on 14 October 2020 and had been elevated to deputy prime minister on 4 June 2021, retained only his Finance portfolio after this decision. Prime Minister Oli thereafter divided the portfolios among the five remaining members of the cabinet on 24 June 2021.

Dissolution 
On 12 July 2021, the Supreme Court ruled that the president's decision to dissolve the House of Representatives on the recommendation of prime minister Oli was unlawful and ordered the appointment of Nepali Congress president Sher Bahadur Deuba as prime minister within 28 hours, after the opposition alliance had filed writs against the dissolution of the House of Representatives. President Bhandari appointed Deuba as the prime minister in accordance with Article 76 (5) of the Constitution of Nepal, and he was sworn in for a fifth term on 13 July 2021.

Final arrangement

Previous arrangements

4 June – 22 June 2021

December 2020 – June 2021

October – December 2020

November 2019 – October 2020

February 2018 – November 2019

See also 

 First Oli cabinet

Notes

References 

Government of Nepal
Cabinet of Nepal
2021 disestablishments in Nepal
2018 establishments in Nepal